USS Fort Lauderdale (LPD-28) is the twelfth Flight I  ship of the United States Navy. The ship is the first ship of the United States Navy to be named for Fort Lauderdale, Florida.

Design
The LX(R) is intended to replace current  and  dock landing ships. In 2014, the Navy commenced design of LX(R) based on a modified San Antonio-class design. Because this design work is in progress, the Navy has created design innovations and cost-reduction strategies around the San Antonio-class design, and the Navy believes that it can apply these innovations and strategies to Fort Lauderdale, allowing her to be built at reduced cost. The main design features intended to reduce the cost of Fort Lauderdale compared to the San Antonio-class on which she is based are simplified bow works, replacement of the forward and aft composite masts with steel masts, removal of structures from the boat valley, and a stern gate which is open at the top. This will make Fort Lauderdale a "transitional ship" between the current San Antonio-class design and future LX(R) vessels.

Fort Lauderdale incorporates high temperature superconductor-based mine protection degaussing system built by American Superconductor to reduce the magnetic signature of the ship.

History
On 9 March 2016, the ship was given the name Fort Lauderdale, and the contract to build her was awarded to HII's Ingalls Shipyard on 19 December 2016. Fort Lauderdale keel was laid down on 13 October 2017, at Ingalls Shipyard in Pascagoula, Mississippi. She was launched on 28 March 2020, and her acceptance trials were completed on 31 January 2022. The ship was commissioned during a ceremony in her namesake city of Fort Lauderdale, Florida, on 30 July 2022. She arrived at her homeport in Norfolk, Virginia on 4 August 2022.

References 

 

San Antonio-class amphibious transport docks
Proposed ships of the United States Navy
2020 ships